Dance Like Nobody's Watching is a six-track EP released by American ska/pop band Suburban Legends, released on May 12, 2006. The EP signaled a drastic change in the band's sound, which also followed major lineup changes following the departure of lead vocalist Tim Maurer and trumpet player Aaron Bertram, and the untimely death of trombonist Ryan Dallas Cook. The band's previous release, Rump Shaker, was a poppy ska punk release, whereas Dance Like Nobody's Watching largely abandoned the ska influence in favor of a funk/disco-influenced sound, which would feature heavily in their following release, Infectious in 2007, and somewhat on 2008's Let's Be Friends, which featured a few ska tracks. The sudden genre change alienated some of the band's fanbase. This genre change was largely abandoned in favor of the band's original ska-influenced style with the release of Going on Tour in 2010 and Day Job in 2012.

The EP's first five tracks are all-new, funk/disco-influenced pop rock, with a soft, melancholy piano rock version of "Bright Spring Morning," a track from the group's 2003 album, Rump Shaker. This version of the song was first performed at the band's October 28, 2005, performance at iMusicast in Oakland, the first show after trombonist Ryan Dallas Cook's death.

The band performed "Come Back Home" on G4's Attack of the Show! on April 28, 2006, in promotion of the EP.

Track listing
"Come Back Home" – 3:46
"This Cherry" – 3:55
"Hey DJ" – 3:30
"Mean Girl" – 3:19
"Golden Touch" – 3:31
"Bright Spring Morning" – 5:13

Personnel
Vincent Walker – vocals
Brian Klemm – lead guitar
Derek Lee Rock – drums
Mike Hachey – bass guitar
Brian Robertson – trombone
Luis Beza – trumpet
Phillip Inzerillo – trombone

Dance Like Nobody's Watching: Tokyo Nights

Dance Like Nobody's Watching: Tokyo Nights is a full-length Japan-only album released by Suburban Legends, and was released on March 21, 2007. It contains the original EP (with slightly re-ordered track listing), a cover song, two new songs (which later appeared on the band's full-length album Infectious) and songs from the album Rump Shaker, remixed and complete with a new vocal track from Vince Walker, as well as new horn and synthesizer tracks. The album is Japan exclusive but trombone player and webmaster Brian Robertson has hinted the album may be available on iTunes for download in the future.

A cover of Katteni-Shindobatto by Southern All Stars was recorded for the album, but did not make it onto the final release due to publishing issues. It was sung entirely in Japanese by Vince Walker.

Track listing
"This Cherry"
"Hey DJ"
"Come Back Home"
"Mean Girl"
"Golden Touch"
"Dancing Machine"
"You Told Me That"
"Bed of Roses"
"Up All Night"
"Powerful Game"
"Bright Spring Morning"

Personnel
Vincent Walker – vocals
Brian Klemm – lead guitar
Derek Lee Rock – drums
Mike Hachey – bass guitar
Brian Robertson – trombone
Luis Beza – trumpet
Dallas Kruse – keyboard, keytar
Phillip Inzerillo – trombone (only on tracks 1–5)

References

External links
Official Japanese website for DLNW: Tokyo Nights

Suburban Legends albums
2006 EPs
2007 albums